This articles lists feature film series having between 11 and 20 entries.

11

A
The Aldrich Family *
What a Life (1949)
Life with Henry (1952)
Henry Aldrich for President (1952)
Henry Aldrich, Editor (1952)
Henry and Dizzy (1952)
Henry Aldrich Swings It (1953)
Henry Aldrich Gets Glamour (1953)
Henry Aldrich Haunts a House (1953)
Henry Aldrich, Boy Scout (1954)
Henry Aldrich Plays Cupid (1954)
Henry Aldrich's Little Secret (1954)

C
Coffin Joe
At Midnight I'll Take Your Soul (1963)
This Night I'll Possess Your Corpse (1967)
The Strange World of Coffin Joe (1968)
Awakening of the Beast (1970)
The End of Man (1970)
The Bloody Exorcism of Coffin Joe (1974)
The Strange Hostel of Naked Pleasures (1976)
Hellish Flesh (1977)
Hallucinations of a Deranged Mind (1978)
Perversion (1979)
Embodiment of Evil (2008) (a.k.a. Encarnação do Demônio)
The Crime Club
The Westland Case (1937)
The Black Doll (1938)
The Lady in the Morgue (1938)
Danger on the Air (1938)
The Last Express (1938)
Gambling Ship (1938)
The Last Warning (1938)
Mystery of the White Room (1939)
Inside Information (1939)
The House of Fear (1939)
The Witness Vanishes (1939)

F
Fast & Furious *
The Fast and the Furious (2001)   
2 Fast 2 Furious (2003)   
The Fast and the Furious: Tokyo Drift (2006) 
Fast & Furious (2009) 
Fast Five (2011)
Fast & Furious 6 (2013) 
Furious 7 (2015)
The Fate of the Furious (2017)
Fast & Furious Presents: Hobbs & Shaw (2019) (spin-off)
F9 (2021)
Fast X (2023)

G
Gingerdead Man vs. Evil Bong
The Gingerdead Man (2005)
Evil Bong (2006)
Gingerdead Man 2: Passion of the Crust (2008) (V)
Evil Bong 2: King Bong (2009)
Evil Bong 3D: The Wrath of Bong (2011)
Gingerdead Man 3: Saturday Night Cleaver (2011) (V)
Gingerdead Man vs. Evil Bong (2013)
Evil Bong 420 (2015)
Evil Bong High-5! (2016)Evil Bong 666 (2017)Evil Bong 777 (2018)

HHalloween Halloween (1978)Halloween II (1981)Halloween III: Season of the Witch (1982) Halloween 4: The Return of Michael Myers (1988)Halloween 5: The Revenge of Michael Myers (1989)Halloween: The Curse of Michael Myers (1995)Halloween H20: 20 Years Later (1998) Halloween: Resurrection (2002)Halloween (2018) Halloween Kills (2021)Halloween Ends (2022)

L
Lash LaRueDead Man's Gold (1948)Mark of the Lash (1948)Frontier Revenge (1948)Outlaw Country (1949)Son of a Bad Man (1949)The Daltons' Women (1950)King of the Bullwhip (1950)The Thundering Trail (1951)The Vanishing Outpost (1951)The Black Lash (1952)The Frontier Phantom (1952)Love Comes SoftlyLove Comes Softly (2003) (TV)Love's Enduring Promise (2004) (TV)Love's Long Journey (2005) (TV)Love's Abiding Joy (2006) (TV)Love's Unending Legacy (2007) (TV)Love's Unfolding Dream (2008) (TV)Love Takes Wing (2009) (TV)Love Finds a Home (2009) (TV)Love Begins (2011) (TV) (prequel)Love's Everlasting Courage (2011) (TV) (prequel)Love's Christmas Journey (2011) (TV)

MMadame AemaAema buin (1982)Madame Aema 2 (1984)Madame Aema 3 (1985)Madame Aema 4 (1990)Madame Aema 5 (1991)Madame Aema 6 (1992)Madame Aema 7 (1992)Madame Aema 8 (1993)Madame Aema 9 (1993)Madame Aema 10 (1994)Madame Aema 11 (1995)Mickey Mouse ****Fantasia (1940)Fun and Fancy Free (1947)The Mickey Mouse Anniversary Show (1968) (TV)Mickey Mouse Jubliee Show (1978)The Spirit of Mickey (1998) (V)Mickey's Once Upon a Christmas (1999) (V)Fantasia 2000 (1999)Mickey's Magical Christmas: Snowed in at the House of Mouse (2001) (V)Mickey's House of Villains (2002) (V)Mickey, Donald, Goofy: The Three Musketeers (2004) (V)Mickey's Twice Upon a Christmas (2004) (V)Mystery WomanMystery Woman (2003) (TV)Mystery Woman: Mystery Weekend (2005) (TV)Mystery Woman: Snapshot (2005) (TV)Mystery Woman: Sing Me a Murder (2005) (TV)Mystery Woman: Vision of a Murder (2005) (TV)Mystery Woman: Game Time (2005) (TV)Mystery Woman: At First Sight (2006) (TV)Mystery Woman: Wild West Mystery (2006) (TV)Mystery Woman: Oh Baby (2006) (TV)Mystery Woman: Redemption (2006) (TV)Mystery Woman: In the Shadows (2007) (TV)

NNaruto the Movie ** Naruto the Movie: Ninja Clash in the Land of Snow (2004)Naruto the Movie: Legend of the Stone of Gelel (2005) Naruto the Movie: Guardians of the Crescent Moon Kingdom (2006)Naruto Shippuden the Movie (2007)Naruto Shippuden the Movie: Bonds (2008)Naruto Shippuden the Movie: The Will of Fire (2009)Naruto Shippuden the Movie: The Lost Tower (2010)Naruto the Movie: Blood Prison (2011)Road to Ninja: Naruto the Movie (2012)The Last: Naruto the Movie (2014)Boruto: Naruto the Movie (2015)

SSquadra antiscippoSquadra antiscippo (1976)Squadra antifurto (1976)Squadra antitruffa (1977)Squadra antimafia (1978)Assassinio sul Tevere (1979)Squadra antigangsters (1979)Delitto a Porta Romana (1980)Delitto al ristorante cinese (1981)Delitto sull'autostrada (1982)Delitto in Formula Uno (1984)Delitto al Blue Gay (1984)Star Wars *************
 Star Wars: Episode IV - A New Hope (1977)
 Star Wars: Episode V - The Empire Strikes Back (1980)
 Star Wars: Episode VI - Return of the Jedi (1983)
 Star Wars: Episode I – The Phantom Menace (1999)
 Star Wars: Episode II – Attack of the Clones (2002)
 Star Wars: Episode III – Revenge of the Sith (2005)
 Star Wars: Episode VII - The Force Awakens (2015)
 Star Wars: Episode VIII - The Last Jedi (2017)
 Star Wars: Episode IX - The Rise of Skywalker (2019)
 Rogue One: A Star Wars Story (2016)
 Solo: A Star Wars Story (2018)
WWizarding WorldHarry Potter and the Philosopher's Stone (2001)Harry Potter and the Chamber of Secrets (2002)Harry Potter and the Prisoner of Azkaban (2004)Harry Potter and the Goblet of Fire (2005)Harry Potter and the Order of the Phoenix (2007)Harry Potter and the Half-Blood Prince (2009)Harry Potter and the Deathly Hallows – Part 1 (2010)Harry Potter and the Deathly Hallows – Part 2 (2011)Fantastic Beasts and Where to Find Them (2016) (spin-off)Fantastic Beasts: The Crimes of Grindelwald (2018) (spin-off)Fantastic Beasts: The Secrets of Dumbledore (2022) (spin-off)

Y
Yogi Bear ***** (a)Hey There, It's Yogi Bear! (1964)Yogi's Ark Lark (1972) (TV)Hanna-Barbera's All-Star Comedy Ice Revue (1978) (TV)Yogi's First Christmas (1980) (TV)Yogi's Great Escape (1987) (TV)Yogi Bear and the Magical Flight of the Spruce Goose (1988) (TV)The Good, the Bad, and Huckleberry Hound (1988) (TV)Yogi and the Invasion of the Space Bears (1988) (TV)Yogi the Easter Bear (1994) (TV)Scooby-Doo! in Arabian Nights (1994) (TV)Yogi Bear (2010) (Live-action)Young and DangerousGoo wak chai: Yan joi gong woo (1996)Young and Dangerous 2 (1996)Young and Dangerous 3 (1996)Once Upon a Time in Triad Society (1996) (spin-off)Young and Dangerous 4 (1997)Young and Dangerous 5 (1998)Portland Street Blues (1998) (spin-off)Young and Dangerous: The Prequel (1998) (prequel)The Legendary Tai Fei (1999) (spin-off)Those Were the Days (2000) (spin-off)Young and Dangerous 6: Born to Be King (2000)

12

AAurora Teagarden MysteryA Bone to Pick (2015) (TV)Real Murders (2015) (TV)Three Bedrooms, One Corpse (2016) (TV)The Julius House (2016) (TV)Dead Over Heels (2017) (TV)A Bundle of Trouble (2017) (TV)Last Scene Alive (2018) (TV)Reap What You Sew (2018) (TV)The Disappearing Game (2018) (TV)A Game of Cat and Mouse (2019) (TV)An Inheritance to Die For (2019) (TV)A Very Foul Play (2019) (TV)

BBomba, the Jungle BoyBomba, the Jungle Boy (1949)Bomba on Panther Island (1949)The Lost Volcano (1950)Bomba and the Hidden City (1950)The Lion Hunters (1951)Elephant Stampede (1951)African Treasure (1952)Bomba and the Jungle Girl (1952)Safari Drums (1953)The Golden Idol (1954)Killer Leopard (1954)Lord of the Jungle (1955)

FThe Flintstones ************* (a)The Man Called Flintstone (1966)A Flintstone Christmas (1977) (TV)The Flintstones: Little Big League (1978) (TV)The Flintstones Meet Rockula and Frankenstone (1979) (TV)The Jetsons Meet the Flintstones (1987) (TV)I Yabba-Dabba Do! (1993) (TV)Hollyrock-a-Bye Baby (1993) (TV)The Flintstones (1994)A Flintstones Christmas Carol (1994) (TV)The Flintstones in Viva Rock Vegas (2000)The Flintstones: On the Rocks (2001) (TV)The Flintstones & WWE: Stone Age SmackDown! (2015) (V)

GGameraGamera, the Giant Monster (1965)Gamera vs. Barugon (1966)Gamera vs. Gyaos (1967)Gamera vs. Viras (1968)Gamera vs. Guiron (1969)Gamera vs. Jiger (1970)Gamera vs. Zigra (1971)Gamera: Super Monster (1980)Gamera: Guardian of the Universe (1995)Gamera 2: Advent of Legion (1996)Gamera 3: Awakening of Irys (1999)Gamera the Brave (2006)

HThe Hombre Lobo Series (a.k.a. The Waldemar Daninsky Series)La Marca del Hombre Lobo (Mark of the Wolf Man) (1968)Las Noches del Hombre Lobo (The Nights of the Wolf Man) (1968)Los Monstruos del Terror (The Monsters of Terror) (1969)La Furia del Hombre Lobo (Fury of the Wolf Man) (1970)La Noche de Walpurgis (Walpurgis Night) (1970)Dr. Jekyll y el Hombre Lobo (Dr. Jekyll and the Wolf Man) (1971)El Retorno de Walpurgis (The Return of Walpurgis) (1972) (a.k.a. Curse of the Devil)La Maldicion de la Bestia (Curse of the Beast) (1975)El Retorno del Hombre Lobo (Return of the Wolf Man) (1980)La Bestia y la Espada Magica (The Beast and the Magic Sword) (1983)Licántropo (Lycantropus: The Moonlight Murders) (1996) (a.k.a. The Full Moon Killer)Tomb of the Werewolf (2004)

JJoe Palooka *Palooka (1934)Joe Palooka, Champ (1946)Gentleman Joe Palooka (1946)Joe Palooka in the Knockout (1947)Joe Palooka in Fighting Mad (1948)Joe Palooka in Winner Take All (1948)Joe Palooka in the Big Fight (1949)Joe Palooka in the Counterpunch (1949)Joe Palooka Meets Humphrey (1950)Joe Palooka in Humphrey Takes a Chance (1950)Joe Palooka in the Squared Circle (1950)Joe Palooka in Triple Cross (1951)L.E.T.H.A.L. Ladies (a.k.a. Triple-B, Bullets, Bombs and Babes)Malibu Express (1985)Hard Ticket to Hawaii (1987) (a.k.a. Piège Mortel à Hawaï)Picasso Trigger (1988)Savage Beach (1989)Guns (1990)Do or Die (1991) (a.k.a. Girls, Games & Guns)Hard Hunted (1992)Fit to Kill (1993)Enemy Gold (1993)The Dallas Connection (1994)Day of the Warrior (1996)L.E.T.H.A.L. Ladies: Return to Savage Beach (1998)

MMichael Shayne *Michael Shayne, Private Detective (1940)Sleepers West (1941)Dressed to Kill (1941)Blue, White and Perfect (1942)The Man Who Wouldn't Die (1942)Just Off Broadway (1942)Time to Kill (1942)Murder Is My Business (1946)Larceny in Her Heart (1946)Blonde for a Day (1946)Three on a Ticket (1947)Too Many Winners (1947)The Muppets ******The Muppet Movie (1979)The Great Muppet Caper (1981)The Muppets Take Manhattan (1984)The Muppet Christmas Carol (1992)Muppet Classic Theater (1994) (V)Muppet Treasure Island (1996)Muppets From Space (1999)Kermit's Swamp Years (2002) (V)It's a Very Merry Muppet Christmas Movie (2002) (TV)The Muppets' Wizard of Oz (2005) (TV)The Muppets (2011)Muppets Most Wanted (2014)Nemuri Kyoshirō (Matsukata Hiroki series)Sleepy Eyes of Death 1: The Chinese Jade (1963)Sleepy Eyes of Death 2: Sword of Adventure (1964)Sleepy Eyes of Death 3: Full Circle Killing (1964)Sleepy Eyes of Death 4: Sword of Seduction (1964)Sleepy Eyes of Death 5: Sword of Fire (1965)Sleepy Eyes of Death 6: Sword of Satan (1965)Sleepy Eyes of Death 7: The Mask of the Princess (1966)Sleepy Eyes of Death 8: Sword of Villainy (1966)Sleepy Eyes of Death 9: A Trail of Traps (1967)Sleepy Eyes of Death 10: Hell Is a Woman (1968)Sleepy Eyes of Death 11: In the Spider's Lair (1968)Sleepy Eyes of Death 12: Castle Menagerie (1969)

SSigned, Sealed, Delivered *Second Chances (2013) (TV)Signed, Sealed, Delivered for Christmas (2014) (TV)From Paris with Love (2015) (TV)Truth Be Told (2015) (TV)The Impossible Dream (2015) (TV)From the Heart (2016) (TV)One in a Million (2016) (TV)Lost Without You (2016) (TV)Higher Ground (2017) (TV)Home Again (2017) (TV)The Road Less Travelled (2018) (TV)To the Altar (2018) (TV)

13

AAVP UniverseAlien (1979)Aliens (1986)Predator (1987)Predator 2 (1990)Alien 3 (1992)Alien Resurrection (1997)Alien vs. Predator (2004) (crossover) Aliens vs. Predator: Requiem (2007) (crossover) Predators (2010)Prometheus (2012) (prequel)Alien: Covenant (2017) (prequel)The Predator (2018)Prey (2022) (prequel)American GirlSamantha: An American Girl Holiday (2004) (TV)Felicity: An American Girl Adventure (2005) (TV)Molly: An American Girl on the Home Front (2006) (TV)Kit Kittredge: An American Girl (2008)An American Girl: Chrissa Stands Strong (2009) (V)An American Girl: McKenna Shoots for the Stars (2012) (V)An American Girl: Saige Paints the Sky (2013) (V)An American Girl: Isabelle Dances Into the Spotlight (2014) (V)An American Girl: Grace Stirs Up Success (2015) (V)An American Girl: Lea to the Rescue (2016) (V)An American Girl Story – Melody 1963: Love Has to Win (2016) (V)An American Girl Story – Maryellen 1955: Extraordinary Christmas (2016) (V)An American Girl Story - Ivy & Julie 1976: A Happy Balance (2017) (V)

BBratz (a) *Bratz: Starrin & Stylin' (2004) (V)Bratz Rock Angelz (2004) (V)Bratz Genie Magic (2005) (V)Bratz Babyz: The Movie (2005) (V)Bratz Forever Diamondz (2005) (V)Bratz Fashion Pixiez (2006) (V)Bratz Kidz: Sleep-Over Adventure (2006) (V)Bratz Super Babyz (2007) (V)Bratz: The Movie (2007) (live-action)Bratz Kidz Fairy Tales (2007) (V)Bratz Babyz Save Christmas (2007) (V)Bratz Girls Really Rock (2008) (V)Bratz Pampered Petz (2008) (V)

M
Madea Simmons ***Diary of a Mad Black Woman (2005)Madea's Family Reunion (2006)Meet the Browns (2008)Madea Goes to Jail (2009)I Can Do Bad All By Myself (2009)Madea's Big Happy Family (2011)Madea's Witness Protection (2012)A Madea Christmas (2013)Madea's Tough Love (2015) (V) (a)Boo! A Madea Halloween (2016)Boo 2! A Madea Halloween (2017)A Madea Family Funeral (2019)A Madea Homecoming (2022)Mothra *Mothra (1961)Mothra vs. Godzilla (1964)Ghidorah, the Three-Headed Monster (1964)Ebirah, Horror of the Deep (1966)Destroy All Monsters (1968)Godzilla vs. Mothra (1992)Godzilla vs. SpaceGodzilla (1994)Rebirth of Mothra (1996)Rebirth of Mothra II (1997)Rebirth of Mothra III (1998)Godzilla, Mothra & King Ghidorah: Giant Monsters All-Out Attack (2001)Godzilla: Tokyo S.O.S. (2003)Godzilla: Final Wars (2004)

PPekka and PätkäPekka Puupää (1953) (1953) (1954) (1955) (1955) (1955) (1957) (1957) (1957)Pekka ja Pätkä Suezilla (1958) (1958) (1959) (1960)

SSchulmädchen-ReportSchulmädchen-Report: Was Eltern nicht für möglich halten (1970)Schulmädchen-Report 2: Was Eltern den Schlaf raubt (1971)Schulmädchen-Report 3. Teil - Was Eltern nicht mal ahnen (1972)Schulmädchen-Report 4. Teil - Was Eltern oft verzweifeln lässt (1972)Schulmädchen-Report 5. Teil - Was Eltern wirklich wissen sollten (1973)Schulmädchen-Report 6: Was Eltern gern vertuschen möchten (1973)Schulmädchen-Report 7: Doch das Herz muß dabei sein (1974)Schulmädchen-Report 8: Was Eltern nie erfahren dürfen (1974)Schulmädchen-Report 9: Reifeprüfung vor dem Abitur (1975)Schulmädchen-Report 10: Irgendwann fängt jede an (1976)Schulmädchen-Report 11. Teil - Probieren geht über Studieren (1977)Schulmädchen-Report 12. Teil - Wenn das die Mammi wüßte (1978)Vergiss beim Sex die Liebe nicht - Der neue Schulmächenreport 13. Teil (1980)Star Trek **********Star Trek: The Motion Picture (1979)Star Trek II: The Wrath of Khan (1982)Star Trek III: The Search for Spock (1984)Star Trek IV: The Voyage Home (1986)Star Trek V: The Final Frontier (1989)Star Trek VI: The Undiscovered Country (1991)Star Trek Generations (1994)Star Trek: First Contact (1996)Star Trek: Insurrection (1998)Star Trek: Nemesis (2002)Star Trek (2009)Star Trek Into Darkness (2013)Star Trek Beyond (2016)

WWangan Middonaito *Wangan Midnight (1991)Wangan Midnight II (1993)Wangan Midnight III (1993)Wangan Midnight 4 (1993)Wangan Midnight Special Director's Cut Complete Edition (1994)Wangan Midnight Final: GT-R Legend - Act 1 (1994)Wangan Midnight Final: GT-R Legend - Act 2 (1994)Devil GT-R Full Tuning (1994)Showdown! Devil GT-R (1994)Wangan Midnight S30 vs. Gold GT-R - Part I (1998)Wangan Midnight S30 vs. Gold GT-R - Part II (1998)Wangan Midnight Return (2001)Wangan Midnight: The Movie (2009)
Wild Bill HickokThe Great Adventures of Wild Bill Hickok (1938) (Serial)Prairie Schooners (1940)Beyond the Sacramento (1940)The Wildcat of Tucson (1940)Across the Sierras (1941)North from the Lone Star (1941)Hands Across the Rockies (1941)King of Dodge City (1941)Roaring Frontiers (1941)The Lone Star Vigilantes (1942)Bullets for Bandits (1942)The Devil's Trail (1942)Prairie Gunsmoke (1942)

14

AAir BudAir Bud (1997)Air Bud: Golden Receiver (1998)Air Bud: World Pup (2000)Air Bud: Seventh Inning Fetch (2002) (V)Air Bud: Spikes Back (2003) (V)Air Buddies (2006) (V)Snow Buddies (2008) (V)Space Buddies (2009) (V)Santa Buddies (2009) (V)The Search for Santa Paws (2010) (V) (Santa Buddies spin-off and first prequel)Spooky Buddies (2011) (V)Treasure Buddies (2012) (V)Santa Paws 2: The Santa Pups (2012) (V) (Santa Buddies spin-off and second prequel)Super Buddies (2013) (V)American Film TheatreThe Man in the Glass Booth (1975)In Celebration (1975)Galileo (1975)Jacques Brel Is Alive and Well and Living in Paris (1975)Philadelphia, Here I Come (1975)Lost in the Stars (1974)Rhinoceros (1974)Butley (1974)The Maids (1974)A Delicate Balance (1973)The Homecoming (1973)The Iceman Cometh (1973)Luther (1973)Three Sisters (1970)

B
Boston Blackie, portrayed by Chester MorrisMeet Boston Blackie (1941)Confessions of Boston Blackie (1941)Alias Boston Blackie (1942)Boston Blackie Goes Hollywood (1942)After Midnight with Boston Blackie (1943)The Chance of a Lifetime (1943)One Mysterious Night (1944)Boston Blackie Booked on Suspicion (1945)Boston Blackie's Rendezvous (1945)A Close Call for Boston Blackie (1946)The Phantom Thief (1946)Boston Blackie and the Law (1946)Trapped by Boston Blackie (1948)Boston Blackie's Chinese Venture (1949)

DDarna ***Darna (1951)Darna at ang Babaeng Lawin (1952)Si Darna at ang Impakta (1963)Isputnik vs. Darna (1963)Darna at ang Babaing Tuod (1964)Si Darna at ang Planetman (1969)Lipad, Darna, Lipad! (1973)Darna and the Giants (1974)Darna vs. the Planet Women (1975)Darna, Kuno? (1979)Bira! Darna! Bira! (1979)Darna at Ding (1980)Darna (1991)Mars Ravelo's Darna! Ang Pagbabalik (1994)

FFIFA World CupGerman Giants (1954)Hinein! (1958)Viva Brazil (1962)Goal! (1966)The World at Their Feet (1970)Heading for Glory (1974)Campeones (1978)G'olé! (1982)Hero (1987)Soccer Shoot-Out (1990)Two Billion Hearts (1994)La Coupe de la Gloire (1998)Seven Games from Glory (2002)The Grand Finale (2006) (V)

LThe Land Before Time * (A)The Land Before Time (1988)The Land Before Time II: The Great Valley Adventure (1994) (V)The Land Before Time III: The Time of the Great Giving (1995) (V)The Land Before Time IV: Journey Through the Mists (1996) (V)The Land Before Time V: The Mysterious Island (1997) (V)The Land Before Time VI: The Secret of Saurus Rock (1998) (V)The Land Before Time VII: The Stone of Cold Fire (2000) (V)The Land Before Time VIII: The Big Freeze (2001) (V)The Land Before Time IX: Journey to Big Water (2002) (V)The Land Before Time X: The Great Longneck Migration (2003) (V)The Land Before Time XI: Invasion of the Tinysauruses (2005) (V)The Land Before Time XII: The Great Day of the Flyers (2007) (TV)The Land Before Time XIII: The Wisdom of Friends (2007) (V)The Land Before Time: Journey of the Brave (2016) (V)

OOlsen-banden (Danish series)Olsen-banden (1968)Olsen-banden på spanden (1969)Olsen-banden i Jylland (1971)Olsen-bandens store kup (1972)Olsen-banden går amok (1973)Olsen-bandens sidste bedrifter (1974)Olsen-banden på sporet (1975)Olsen-banden ser rødt (1976)Olsen-banden deruda' (1977)Olsen-banden går i krig (1978)Olsen-banden overgiver sig aldrig (1979)Olsen-bandens flugt over plankeværket (1981)Olsen-banden over alle bjerge (1981)Olsen-bandens sidste stik (1998)Olsenbanden (Norwegian series)Olsenbanden Operasjon Egon (1969)Olsenbanden og Dynamitt-Harry (1970)Olsenbanden tar gull (1972)Olsenbanden og Dynamitt-Harry går amok (1973)Olsenbanden møter Kongen og Knekten (1974)Olsenbandens siste bedrifter (1975)Olsenbanden for full musikk (1976)Olsenbanden og Dynamitt-Harry på sporet (1977)Olsenbanden og Data-Harry sprenger verdensbanken (1978)Olsenbanden mot nye høyder (1979)Olsenbanden gir seg aldri (1981)Olsenbandens aller siste kupp (1982)…men Olsenbanden var ikke død (1984)Olsenbandens siste stikk (1999)One Piece *One Piece (2000)Clockwork Island Adventure (2001)Chopper's Kingdom on the Island of Strange Animals (2002)Dead End Adventure (2003)The Cursed Holy Sword (2004)Baron Omatsuri and the Secret Island (2005)Giant Mecha Soldier of Karakuri Castle (2006)The Desert Princess and the Pirates: Adventures in Alabasta (2007)Episode of Chopper Plus: Bloom in the Winter, Miracle Cherry Blossom (2008)Strong World (2009)Z (2012)Gold (2016)Stampede (2019)Red (2022)

S
Sherlock Holmes (1939 film series)The Hound of the Baskervilles (1939)The Adventures of Sherlock Holmes (1939)Sherlock Holmes and the Voice of Terror (1942)Sherlock Holmes and the Secret Weapon (1943)Sherlock Holmes in Washington (1943)Sherlock Holmes Faces Death (1943)The Spider Woman (1944)The Scarlet Claw (1944)The Pearl of Death (1944)The House of Fear (1945)The Woman in Green (1945)Pursuit to Algiers (1945)Terror by Night (1946)Dressed to Kill (1946)

15DC Extended Universe *Man of Steel (2013)Batman v Superman: Dawn of Justice (2016)Suicide Squad (2016)Wonder Woman (2017)Justice League (2017)Aquaman (2018)Shazam! (2019)Birds of Prey (2020) (spin-off)Wonder Woman 1984 (2020)The Suicide Squad (2021)Black Adam (2022) (spin-off)Shazam! Fury of the Gods (2023)The Flash (2023)Blue Beetle (2023)Aquaman and the Lost Kingdom (2023)

GGodzilla **** Shōwa era (1954–1975) Godzilla (1954)Godzilla Raids Again (1955)King Kong vs. Godzilla (1962)Mothra vs. Godzilla (1964)Ghidorah, the Three-Headed Monster (1964)Invasion of Astro-Monster (1965)Ebirah, Horror of the Deep (1966)Son of Godzilla (1967)Destroy All Monsters (1968)All Monsters Attack (1969)Godzilla vs. Hedorah (1971)Godzilla vs. Gigan (1972)Godzilla vs. Megalon (1973)Godzilla vs. Mechagodzilla (1974)Terror of Mechagodzilla (1975)

PPhilo VanceThe Canary Murder Case (1929)The Greene Murder Case (1929)The Benson Murder Case (1930)The Bishop Murder Case (1930)The Kennel Murder Case (1933)The Dragon Murder Case (1934)The Casino Murder Case (1935)The Garden Murder Case (1936)The Scarab Murder Case (1936)Night of Mystery (1937)The Gracie Allen Murder Case (1939)Calling Philo Vance (1940)Philo Vance Returns (1947)Philo Vance's Gamble (1947)Philo Vance's Secret Mission (1947)

SShake, Rattle & RollShake, Rattle & Roll (1984)Shake, Rattle & Roll II (1990)Shake, Rattle & Roll III (1991)Shake, Rattle & Roll IV (1992)Shake, Rattle & Roll V (1994)Shake, Rattle & Roll VI (1997)Shake, Rattle & Roll 2k5 (2005)Shake, Rattle & Roll 8 (2006)Shake, Rattle & Roll 9 (2007)Shake, Rattle & Roll X (2008)Shake, Rattle & Roll XI (2009)Shake, Rattle & Roll XII (2010)Shake, Rattle & Roll 13 (2011)Shake, Rattle & Roll 14 (2012)Shake, Rattle & Roll XV (2014)
 Star Wars (a) *************Star Wars (1977)Star Wars Holiday Special (1978) (TV) (spin-off)The Empire Strikes Back (1980)Return of the Jedi (1983)The Ewok Adventure (1984) (TV) (spin-off)Ewoks: The Battle for Endor (1985) (TV) (spin-off)Star Wars: Episode I – The Phantom Menace (1999) (prequel)Star Wars: Episode II – Attack of the Clones (2002) (prequel)Star Wars: Episode III – Revenge of the Sith (2005) (prequel)Star Wars: The Clone Wars (2008) (A) (spin-off)Star Wars: The Force Awakens (2015)Rogue One (2016) (spin-off)Star Wars: The Last Jedi (2017)Solo: A Star Wars Story (2018) (spin-off)Star Wars: The Rise of Skywalker (2019)

TThomas & Friends ***Thomas and the Magic Railroad (2000)Calling All Engines! (2005) (V)The Great Discovery (2008)Hero of the Rails (2009)Misty Island Rescue (2010)Day of the Diesels (2011)Blue Mountain Mystery (2012)King of the Railway (2013)Tale of the Brave (2014)The Adventure Begins (2015) (V)Sodor's Legend of the Lost Treasure (2015)The Great Race (2016)Journey Beyond Sodor (2017)Big World! Big Adventures! (2018)Race for the Sodor Cup (2021) (TV)

WWinnie the Pooh (a) ****The Many Adventures of Winnie the Pooh (1977)Pooh's Grand Adventure: The Search for Christopher Robin (1997) (V)Winnie the Pooh: Seasons of Giving (1999) (V)The Tigger Movie (2000)The Book of Pooh: Stories from the Heart (2001) (V)Winnie the Pooh: A Very Merry Pooh Year (2002) (V)Piglet's Big Movie (2003)Winnie the Pooh: Springtime with Roo (2004) (V)Pooh's Heffalump Movie (2005)Pooh's Heffalump Halloween Movie (2005) (V)Super Sleuth Christmas Movie (2007) (V)Tigger & Pooh and a Musical Too (2009) (V)My Friends Tigger & Pooh: Super Duper Super Sleuths (2010) (V)Winnie the Pooh (2011)Christopher Robin (2018)

16

D
DC Animated Movie Universe (A)Justice League: The Flashpoint Paradox (2013) (V)Justice League: War (2014) (V)Son of Batman (2014) (V)Justice League: Throne of Atlantis (2015) (V)Batman vs. Robin (2015) (V)Batman: Bad Blood (2016) (V)Justice League vs. Teen Titans (2016) (V)Justice League Dark (2017) (V)Teen Titans: The Judas Contract (2017) (V)Suicide Squad: Hell to Pay (2018) (V)The Death of Superman (2018) (V)Constantine: City of Demons (2018) (V)Reign of the Supermen (2019) (V)Hush (2019) (V)Wonder Woman: Bloodlines (2019) (V)Justice League Dark: Apokolips War (2020) (V)Dr. Kildare *Internes Can't Take Money (1937)Young Dr. Kildare (1938)Calling Dr. Kildare (1939)The Secret of Dr. Kildare (1939)Dr. Kildare's Strange Case (1940)Dr. Kildare Goes Home  (1940)Dr. Kildare's Crisis (1940)The People vs. Dr. Kildare (1941)Dr. Kildare's Wedding Day (1941)Dr. Kildare's Victory (1942)Calling Dr. Gillespie (1942)Dr. Gillespie's New Assistant (1942)Dr. Gillespie's Criminal Case (1943)Three Men in White (1944)Between Two Women (1945)Dark Delusion (1947)

FThe FalconThe Gay Falcon (1941)A Date with the Falcon (1941)The Falcon Takes Over (1942)The Falcon's Brother (1942)The Falcon Strikes Back (1943)The Falcon in Danger (1943)The Falcon and the Co-eds (1943)The Falcon Out West (1944)The Falcon in Mexico (1944)The Falcon in Hollywood (1944)The Falcon in San Francisco (1945)The Falcon's Alibi (1946)The Falcon's Adventure (1946)Devil's Cargo (1948)Appointment with Murder (1948)Search for Danger (1949)

GGarage Sale MysteryGarage Sale Mystery (2013) (TV)All that Glitters (2014) (TV)The Deadly Room (2015) (TV)The Wedding Dress (2015) (TV)Guilty Until Proven Innocent (2016) (TV)The Novel Murders (2016) (TV)The Art of Murder (2017) (TV)The Beach Murder (2017) (TV)Murder by Text (2017) (TV)Murder Most Medieval (2017) (TV)A Case of Murder (2017) (TV)The Pandora's Box Murders (2018) (TV)The Mask Murder (2018) (TV)Picture a Murder (2018) (TV)Murder in D Minor (2018) (TV)Search & Seized (2019) (TV)Three Little Murders (2019) (TV) 

JJungle Jim with Johnny WeissmullerJungle Jim (1948)The Lost Tribe (1949)Captive Girl (1950)Mark of the Gorilla (1950)Jungle Jim in Pygmy Island (1950)Fury of the Congo (1951)Jungle Manhunt (1951)Jungle Jim in the Forbidden Land (1952)Voodoo Tiger (1952)Savage Mutiny (1953)Valley of the Headhunters (1953)Killer Ape (1953)Jungle Man-Eaters (1954)Cannibal Attack (1954)Jungle Moon Men (1955)Devil Goddess (1956)

LLooney Tunes and Merrie Melodies *********** (a)Bugs Bunny: Superstar (1975)The Bugs Bunny/Road Runner Movie (1979)The Looney Looney Looney Bugs Bunny Movie (1981)Bugs Bunny's 3rd Movie: 1001 Rabbit Tales (1982)Daffy Duck's Movie: Fantastic Island (1983)Daffy Duck's Quackbusters (1988)The Looney Tunes Hall of Fame (1991)Tiny Toon Adventures: How I Spent My Vacation (1992) (V)Space Jam (1996)Tweety's High-Flying Adventure (2000) (V)Baby Looney Tunes' Eggs-traordinary Adventure (2003) (V)Looney Tunes: Back in Action (2003)Bah, Humduck! A Looney Tunes Christmas (2006) (V)Looney Tunes: Rabbits Run (2015) (V)Space Jam: A New Legacy (2021)King Tweety (2022) (V)

OOld Mother RileyOld Mother Riley (1937)Kathleen Mavourneen (1937)Old Mother Riley MP (1938)Old Mother Riley in Paris (1938)Old Mother Riley Joins Up (1939)Old Mother Riley in Society (1940)Old Mother Riley in Business (1940)Old Mother Riley's Circus (1941)Old Mother Riley's Ghost (1941)Old Mother Riley Overseas (1943)Old Mother Riley Detective (1943)Old Mother Riley at Home (1945)Old Mother Riley's New Venture (1949)Old Mother Riley Headmistress (1950)Old Mother Riley's Jungle Treasure (1951)Mother Riley Meets the Vampire (1952)

RRing and Ju-OnRing (1998)Rasen (1998)Ring 2 (1999)Ring 0: Birthday (2000)Ju-On: The Curse (2000)Ju-On: The Curse 2 (2000)Ju-on: The Grudge (2002)Ju-on: The Grudge 2 (2003)Ju-On: White Ghost (2009)Ju-On: Black Ghost (2009)Sadako 3D (2012)Sadako 3D 2 (2013)Ju-On: The Beginning of the End (2014)Ju-On: The Final Curse (2015)Sadako vs. Kayako (2016)Sadako (2019)

SSharpeSharpe's Rifles (1993) (TV)Sharpe's Eagle (1993) (TV)Sharpe's Company (1994) (TV)Sharpe's Enemy (1994) (TV)Sharpe's Honour (1994) (TV)Sharpe's Gold (1995) (TV)Sharpe's Battle (1995) (TV)Sharpe's Sword (1995) (TV)Sharpe's Regiment (1996) (TV)Sharpe's Siege (1996) (TV)Sharpe's Mission (1996) (TV)Sharpe's Revenge (1997) (TV)Sharpe's Justice (1997) (TV)Sharpe's Waterloo (1997) (TV)Sharpe's Challenge (2006) (TV)Sharpe's Peril (2008) (TV)
Sunset CarsonSheriff of Cimarron (1945)Santa Fe Saddlemates (1945)Oregon Trail (1945)Bandits of the Badlands (1945)Rough Riders of Cheyenne (1945)The Cherokee Flash (1945)Days of Buffalo Bill (1946)Alias Billy the Kid (1946)The El Paso Kid (1946)Red River Renegades (1946)Rio Grande Raiders (1946)Fighting Mustang (1948)Deadline (1948)Sunset Carson Rides Again (1948)Rio Grande (1949)Battling Marshal (1950)

WWitchcraftWitchcraft (1988) (V)Witchcraft II: The Temptress (1990) (V)Witchcraft III: The Kiss of Death (1991) (V)Witchcraft IV: The Virgin Heart (1992) (V)Witchcraft V: Dance with the Devil (1993) (V)Witchcraft VI: The Devil's Mistress (1994) (V)Witchcraft VII: Judgement Hour (1995) (V)Witchcraft VIII: Salem's Ghost (1996) (V)Witchcraft IX: Bitter Flesh (1997) (V)Witchcraft X: Mistress of the Craft (1998) (V)Witchcraft XI: Sisters in Blood (2000) (V)Witchcraft XII: In the Lair of the Serpent (2002) (V)Witchcraft XIII: Blood of the Chosen (2006) (V)Witchcraft XIV: Angel of Death (2015) (V)Witchcraft XV: Blood Rose (2015) (V)Witchcraft XVI: Hollywood Coven (2015) (V)

17
AAndy HardyA Family Affair (1937)You're Only Young Once (1937)Judge Hardy's Children (1938)Love Finds Andy Hardy (1938)Out West with the Hardys (1938)Andy Hardy's Dilemma (1938) (short film)The Hardys Ride High (1939)Andy Hardy Gets Spring Fever (1939)Judge Hardy and Son (1939)Andy Hardy Meets Debutante (1940)Andy Hardy's Private Secretary (1941)Life Begins for Andy Hardy (1941)The Courtship of Andy Hardy (1942)Andy Hardy's Double Life (1942)Andy Hardy's Blonde Trouble (1944)Love Laughs at Andy Hardy (1947)Andy Hardy Comes Home (1958)

C
Jetlag Productions' Children's ClassicsHappy, the Littlest Bunny (1994) (V)Cinderella (1994) (V)Leo the Lion: King of the Jungle (1994) (V)Pocahontas (1994) (V)A Christmas Carol (1994) (V)Heidi (1995) (V)Hercules (1995) (V)Alice in Wonderland (1995) (V)Sleeping Beauty (1995) (V) Snow White (1995) (V)Black Beauty (1995) (V)The Nutcracker (1995) (V)Little Red Riding Hood (1995) (V)Curly, the Littlest Puppy (1995) (V)Jungle Book (1995) (V)Magic Gift of the Snowman (1995) (V) The Hunchback of Notre Dame (1996) (V)

J
Jones FamilyEvery Saturday Night (1936)Educating Father (1936)Back to Nature (1936)Off to the Races (1937)Big Business (1937)Hot Water (1937)Borrowing Trouble (1937)Love on a Budget (1938)A Trip to Paris (1938)Safety in Numbers (1938)Down on the Farm (1938)Everybody's Baby (1939)The Jones Family in Hollywood (1939)Quick Millions (1939)Too Busy to Work (1939)Young as You Feel (1940)On Their Own (1940)

LThe Lone RiderThe Lone Rider Rides On (1941)The Lone Rider Crosses the Rio (1941)The Lone Rider in Ghost Town (1941)The Lone Rider in Frontier Fury (1941)The Lone Rider Ambushed (1941)The Lone Rider Fights Back (1941)The Lone Rider and the Bandit (1942)The Lone Rider in Cheyenne (1942)The Lone Rider in Texas Justice (1942)Border Roundup (1942)Overland Stagecoach (1942)Outlaws of Boulder Pass (1942)Wild Horse Rustlers (1943)Death Rides the Plains (1943)Wolves of the Range (1943)Law of the Saddle (1943)Raiders of Red Gap (1943)

MMonster High * *Monster High: New Ghoul at School (2010)Monster High: Fright On! (2011)Monster High: Why Do Ghouls Fall in Love? (2012)Monster High: Escape from Skull Shores (2012)Monster High: Friday Night Frights (2012)Monster High: Ghouls Rule (2012)Monster High: Scaris: City of Frights (2013)Monster High: 13 Wishes (2013)Monster High: Frights, Camera, Action! (2014)Monster High: Freaky Fusion (2014)Monster High: Haunted (2015)Monster High: Boo York, Boo York (2015)Monster High: Great Scarrier Reef (2016)Welcome to Monster High (2016)Monster High: Electrified (2017)
Monster High: The Movie (2022)
Monster High: The Movie 2 (2023)

R
Rin Tin Tin *
The Man from Hell's River (1922)
Where the North Begins (1923)
Shadows of the North (1923)
The Lighthouse by the Sea (1924)
The Clash of the Wolves (1925)
The Night Cry (1926)
While London Sleeps (1926)
Hills of Kentucky (1927)
Tracked by the Police (1927)
A Race for Life (1928)
Jaws of Steel (1928)
The Million Dollar Collar (1929)
A Dog of the Regiment (1929)
Tiger Rose (1929)
The Lightning Warrior (1931)
The Adventures of Rex and Rinty (1935) (serial)
The Return of Rin Tin Tin (1947)

T
Tom and Jerry ******* (a)
Tom and Jerry: The Movie (1992)
Tom and Jerry: The Magic Ring (2001) (V)
Tom and Jerry: Blast Off to Mars (2005) (V)
Tom and Jerry: The Fast and the Furry (2005) (V)
Tom and Jerry: Shiver Me Whiskers (2006) (V)
Tom and Jerry: A Nutcracker Tale (2007) (V)
Tom and Jerry Meet Sherlock Holmes (2010) (V)
Tom and Jerry and the Wizard of Oz (2011) (V)
Tom and Jerry: Robin Hood and His Merry Mouse (2012) (V)
Tom and Jerry's Giant Adventure (2013) (V)
Tom and Jerry: The Lost Dragon (2014) (V)
Tom and Jerry: Spy Quest (2015) (V)
Tom and Jerry: Back to Oz (2016) (V)
Tom and Jerry: Willy Wonka and the Chocolate Factory (2017) (V)
Tom & Jerry (2021)
Tom and Jerry: Cowboy Up! (2022) (V)
Tom and Jerry: Snowman's Land (2022) (V)

W
Whip Wilson
Crashing Thru (1949)
Shadows of the West (1949)
Haunted Trails (1949)
Riders of the Dusk (1949)
Range Land (1949)
Fence Riders (1950)
Gunslingers (1950)
Wanted: Dead or Alive (1951)
Canyon Raiders (1951)
Nevada Badmen (1951)
Stagecoach Driver (1951)
Lawless Cowboys (1951)
Stage to Blue River (1951)
Night Raiders (1952)
The Gunman (1952)
Montana Incident (1952)
Wyoming Roundup (1952)

Z
Za La Mort
 (1914)
Za La Mort (1915)
L'Imboscata (1916)
Anime Buie (1916)
Il Numero 121 (1917)
L'Ultima Impresa (1917)
Il Triangolo Giallo (Serial, 1917)
Nel Gorgo (1918)
 (Serial, 1918)
Sua Eccellenza La Morte (1919)
 (Serial, 1919)
Il Castello di Bronzo (1920)
Quale dei due?  Za La Mort contro Za La Mort (1922)
Un Frak e un Apache (1923)
Za La Mort (film) – Der Traum der Zalavie (1924)
Ultimissime della Notte (1924)
The Opium Den (1947)

18

A
The Amityville Horror
The Amityville Horror (1979)
Amityville II: The Possession (1982)
Amityville 3-D (1983)
Amityville 4: The Evil Escapes (1989)
The Amityville Curse (1990)
Amityville 1992: It's About Time (1992)
Amityville: A New Generation (1993)
Amityville Dollhouse (1996)
The Amityville Horror (2005)
The Amityville Haunting (2011)
The Amityville Asylum (2013)
Amityville Death House (2015)
The Amityville Playhouse (2015)
Amityville: Vanishing Point (2016)
The Amityville Legacy
The Amityville Terror (2016)
Amityville: No Escape (2016)
Amityville: The Awakening (2017)
A Nightmare on Elm Street vs. Friday the 13th * *
Friday the 13th (1980)
Friday the 13th Part 2 (1981)
Friday the 13th Part III (1982)
Friday the 13th: The Final Chapter (1984)
A Nightmare on Elm Street (1984)
Friday the 13th: A New Beginning (1985)
A Nightmare on Elm Street 2: Freddy's Revenge (1985)
Friday the 13th Part VI: Jason Lives (1986)
A Nightmare on Elm Street 3: Dream Warriors (1987)
Friday the 13th Part VII: The New Blood (1988)
A Nightmare on Elm Street 4: The Dream Master (1988)
Friday the 13th Part VIII: Jason Takes Manhattan (1989)
A Nightmare on Elm Street 5: The Dream Child (1989)
Freddy's Dead: The Final Nightmare (1991)
Jason Goes to Hell: The Final Friday (1993)
Wes Craven's New Nightmare (1994)
Jason X (2001)
Freddy vs. Jason (2003)

19

F
Father of Four
Father of Four (1953) 
Father of Four in the Snow (1954) 
Father of Four in the Country (1955) 
Father of Four in the City (1956) 
Father of Four and Uncle Sofus (1957) 
Father of Four and the Wolf Cubs (1958) 
Father of Four on Bornholm (1959) 
Father of Four with Full Music (1961) 
 (1971)
 (2005)
 (2006)
 (2008)
 (2010)
 (2011)
 (2012)
 (2014)
 (2015)
 (2017)
 (2018)

H
Hercules
Le Fatiche di Ercole (The Labors of Hercules) (1957)
Ercole e la regina di Lidia (Hercules and the Queen of Lydia) (1959)
La Vendetta di Ercole (The Revenge of Hercules) (1960)
Gli Amori di Ercole (The Loves of Hercules) (1960)
Ercole alla conquista di Atlantide (Hercules at the Conquest of Atlantis) (1961) 
Ercole al centro della terra (Hercules at the Center of the Earth) (1961)
Maciste contro Ercole nella valle dei guai (Maciste vs. Hercules in the Vale of Woe) (1961)
Ulisse contro Ercole (Ulysses vs. Hercules) (1962)
La Furia di Ercole (The Fury of Hercules) (1962) (a.k.a. The Fury of Samson)
Ercole sfida Sansone (Hercules Challenges Samson) (1963)
Ercole contro Molock (Hercules vs. Moloch) (1963) (a.k.a. The Conquest of Mycene)
Ercole l'invincibile (Hercules the Invincible) (1964)
Il Trionfo di Ercole (The Triumph of Hercules) (1964) (a.k.a. Hercules and the Ten Avengers)
Ercole contro Roma (Hercules Against Rome) (1964)
Ercole contro i figli del sole (Hercules Against the Sons of the Sun) (1964)
Ercole, Sansone, Maciste e Ursus: gli invincibili (Hercules, Samson, Maciste and Ursus: The Invincibles) (1964)
Ercole contro i tiranni di Babilonia (Hercules Against the Tyrants of Babylon) (1964)
Hercules and the Princess of Troy (1965) (a.k.a. Hercules vs. the Sea Monster) (TV)
Sfida dei giganti (Challenge of the Giants) (1965) (TV)

K
Koichiro Uno Sex Stories
Koichiro Uno's Up & Wet (1976)
Koichiro Uno's Yummy and Meaty (1977)
Koichiro Uno's Up and Down (1977)
Koichiro Uno's Wet and Open (1979)
Koichiro Uno's Nurses' Journal (1979)
Koichiro Uno's Female Gymnastic Teacher (1979)
Koichiro Uno's Moist and Steamy (1979)
Koichiro Uno's Wet and Purring (1980)
Koichiro Uno's Hotel Maid Diary (1980)
Koichiro Uno's Shell Competition (1980)
Koichiro Uno's Adultery Diary (1980)
Koichiro Uno's Wet and Riding (1981)
Koichiro Uno's Teasing A Wife (1982)
Koichiro Uno's Female Doctor Is Also Wet (1982)
Koichiro Uno's Dirty Sisters' Barber Shoppe (1983)
Koichiro Uno's Wet and Leering (1983)
Koichiro Uno's Wet and Swinging (1984)
Koichiro Uno's Dancer of Izu (1984)
Koichiro Uno's Caressing the Peach (1985)

M
Mind's Eye (A)
The Mind's Eye: A Computer Animation Odyssey (1990)(V)
Beyond the Mind's Eye (1992)(V)
The Gate to the Mind's Eye (1994)(V)
Odyssey Into The Mind's Eye (1996)(V)
Virtual Nature: A Computer Generated Visual Odyssey From the Makers of the Mind's Eye (1993)(V)
The Mind's Eye Presents Luminous Visions (1998)(V)
The Mind's Eye Presents Ancient Alien (1998)(V)
The Mind's Eye Presents Little Bytes (2000)(V)
Imaginaria (1994)(V)
Turbulence (1997)(V)
Computer Animation Festival Volume 1.0 (1993)(V)
Computer Animation Festival Volume 2.0 (1994)(V)
Computer Animation Festival Volume 3.0 (1996)(V)
Cyberscape: A Computer Animation Vision (1997)(V)
The Mind's Eye Presents Computer Animation Classics (1997)(V)
The Mind's Eye Presents Computer Animation Showcase (1997)(V)
The Mind's Eye Presents Computer Animation Celebration (1998)(V)
Computer Animation Marvels (1999)(V)
Computer Animation Extravaganza (2000)(V)

R
Red Shoe Diaries *
Red Shoe Diaries (1992) (TV)
Red Shoe Diaries 2: Double Dare (1993) (V)
Red Shoe Diaries 3: Another Woman's Lipstick (1993) (V)
Red Shoe Diaries 9: Hotline (1994)
Red Shoe Diaries 4: Auto Erotica (1994) (V)
Red Shoe Diaries 5: Weekend Pass (1995) (V)
Red Shoe Diaries 13: Four on the Floor (1996) (V)
Red Shoe Diaries 9: Slow Train (1996) (V)
Red Shoe Diaries 6: How I Met My Husband (1996) (V)
Red Shoe Diaries 11: Farmer's Daughter (1997) (V)
Red Shoe Diaries 16: Temple of Flesh (1997) (V)
Red Shoe Diaries 7: Burning Up (1997) (V)
Red Shoe Diaries 8: Night of Abandon (1997) (V)
Red Shoe Diaries 12: Girl on a Bike (2000) (V)
Red Shoe Diaries 18: The Game (2000) (V)
Red Shoe Diaries 14: Luscious Lola (2000) (V)
Red Shoe Diaries 19: As She Wishes (2001) (V)
Red Shoe Diaries 17: Swimming Naked (2001) (V)
Red Shoe Diaries 15: Forbidden Zone (2002) (V)s

U
Uuno Turhapuro 
Uuno Turhapuro (1973)
Professori Uuno D.G. Turhapuro (1975)
Lottovoittaja UKK Turhapuro (1976)
Häpy Endkö? Eli kuinka Uuno Turhapuro sai niin kauniin ja rikkaan vaimon (1977)
Rautakauppias Uuno Turhapuro - presidentin vävy (1978)
Uuno Turhapuron aviokriisi (1981)
Uuno Turhapuro menettää muistinsa (1982)
Uuno Turhapuron muisti palailee pätkittäin (1983)
Uuno Turhapuro armeijan leivissä (1984)
Uuno Epsanjassa (1985)
Uuno Turhapuro muuttaa maalle (1986)
Uuno Turhapuro – kaksoisagentti (1987)
Tupla-Uuno (1988)
Uunon huikeat poikamiesvuodet maaseudulla (1990)
Uuno Turhapuro - herra Helsingin herra (1991)
Uuno Turhapuro - Suomen tasavallan herra presidentti (1992)
Uuno Turhapuron poika (1994)
Johtaja Uuno Turhapuro - pisnismies (1998)
Uuno Turhapuro – This Is My Life (2004)

20

D
Debbie Does Dallas *
 Debbie Does Dallas (1978)
 Debbie Does Dallas 2 (1981)
 Debbie Does Dallas 3 (1985)
 Debbie Does Dallas 4 (1988)
 Debbie Does Dallas 5 (1988)
 Debbie Does Las Vegas (1982)
 Debbie Does 'em All (1985)
 Debbie Does the Devil in Dallas (1987)
 Debbie Does 'em All 2 (1988)
 Debbie Does 'em All 3 (1989)
 Debbie Does Wall Street (1991) (V)
 Dallas Does Debbie (1992) (V)
 Debbie Does Dallas ... Again (1994) (V)
 Debbie Does Dallas: The Next Generation (1997) (V)
 Debbie Does Dallas '99 (1999) (V)
 Debbie Does Iowa (2000) (V)
 Debbie Does New Orleans (2000) (V)
 Debbie Does Dallas: The Revenge (2003) (V)
 Debbie Does Dallas: East vs. West (2004) (V)
 Debbie Does S&M (2005) (V)

F
Feluda
Sonar Kella (1974)
Joi Baba Felunath (1979)
Ghurghutiyar Ghotona (1992) (TV)
Golokdham Rahasya (1992) (TV)
Baksho Rahashya (1996) (TV)
Gosaipur Sargaram (1996) (TV)
Sheyal Debota Rahasya (1996) (TV)
Bosepukure Khunkharapi (1996) (TV)
Joto Kando Kathmandute (1996) (TV)
Jahangirer Swarnamudra (1999) (TV)
Ghurghutiyar Ghotona (1999) (TV)
Golapi Mukto Rahashya (1999) (TV)
Ambar Sen Antardhan Rahashya (1999) (TV)
Dr. Munshir Diary (2000) (TV)
Bombaiyer Bombete (2003)
Kailashey Kelenkari (2007)
Tintorettor Jishu (2008)
Gorosthaney Sabdhan (2010)
Royal Bengal Rahashya (2011)
Double Feluda (2016)

N
Nevada Jack McKenzie
The Ghost Rider (1943)
The Stranger from Pecos (1943)
Six Gun Gospel (1943)
Outlaws of Stampede Pass (1943)
The Texas Kid (1943)
Raiders of the Border (1944)
Partners of the Trail (1944)
Law Men (1944)
Range Law (1944)
West of the Rio Grande (1944)
Land of the Outlaws (1944)
Law of the Valley (1944)
Ghost Guns (1944)
The Navajo Trail (1945)
Gun Smoke (1945)
Stranger from Santa Fe (1945)
The Lost Trail (1945)
Frontier Feud (1945)
Border Bandits (1946)
The Haunted Mine (1946)

R
Rex Allen
The Arizona Cowboy (1950)
Hills of Oklahoma (1950)
Redwood Forest Trail (1950)
Under Mexicali Stars (1950)
Trail of Robin Hood (1950)
Silver City Bonanza (1951)
Thunder in God's Country (1951)
Rodeo King and the Senorita (1951)
Utah Wagon Train (1951)
Colorado Sundown (1952)
The Last Musketeer (1952)
Border Saddlemates (1952)
Old Oklahoma Plains (1952)
South Pacific Trail (1952)
Old Overland Trail (1953)
Iron Mountain Trail (1953)
Down Laredo Way (1953)
Shadows of Tombstone (1953)
Red River Shore (1953)
Phantom Stallion (1954)

T
Troublesome Night
Troublesome Night (1997)
Troublesome Night 2 (1997)
Troublesome Night 3 (1998)
Troublesome Night 4 (1998)
Troublesome Night 5 (1999)
Troublesome Night 6 (1999)
Troublesome Night 7 (2000)
Troublesome Night 8 (2000)
Troublesome Night 9 (2001)
Troublesome Night 10 (2001)
Troublesome Night 11 (2001)
Troublesome Night 12 (2001)
Troublesome Night 13 (2002)
Troublesome Night 14 (2002)
Troublesome Night 15 (2002)
Troublesome Night 16 (2002)
Troublesome Night 17 (2002)
Troublesome Night 18 (2003)
Troublesome Night 19 (2003)
Always Be with You (2017)

V
Vacanze di Natale
Vacanze di Natale (1983)
Vacanze in America (1985)
Montecarlo Gran Casinò (1987)
Vacanze di Natale '90 (1990)
Vacanze di Natale '91 (1991)
Vacanze di Natale '95 (1995)
Vacanze di Natale 2000 (1999)
Merry Christmas (2001)
Natale sul Nilo (2002)
Natale in India (2003)
Christmas in Love (2004)
Natale a Miami (2005)
Natale a New York (2006)
Natale in crociera (2007)
Natale a Rio (2008)
Natale a Beverly Hills (2009)
 (2010)
Natale in Sudafrica (2010)
Vacanze di Natale a Cortina (2011)
 (2016)

Notes

Lists of film series

fr:Liste des séries cinématographiques
vi:Danh sách loạt phim trên 10 tập